Garh Jungle is an important place in Hindu mythology, especially Shakta. It is located in the Kanksa CD block (near Durgapur) in the Durgapur subdivision of the Paschim Bardhaman district in West Bengal.

Ashram of Medhas Muni was established here.

Geography

Historical significance 
According to Sri Sri Chandi, King Surath meet to boisya samadhi at Ashram of Medhas. This Ashram was established in Garh Jungle. King Surath and Boisya Samadhi learned Devi Mahatmya from Medhas in this place. Surath organized a durgapuja here in spring time. According to Shri Shri Chandi and Markandeya Purana this durgapuja, which was organized in Garh Jungle, was first Durgapuja of world.

Temples 
Surath established Tridebi's(ত্রিদেবী) temple in this jungle area, i.e. Temple of Mahakali, Mahasaraswati and Mahalakshmi. Now, along with them Ashram of Medhas Muni, a Temple of Mahakal Bhairab(মহাকাল ভৈরব) is also there.

There were 16 temples and only two are present: Shyamarupa Mandir and Shib Mandir.

References 

Paschim Bardhaman district
Tourist attractions in Paschim Bardhaman district